Ny Framtid, abbreviated NYF (New Future) was a eurosceptic political party in Sweden. It was founded before the 1994 parliamentary elections in an attempt to prevent Sweden from joining the European Union. After Sweden joined the EU, the party changed its political position and declared their goal to get Sweden to leave the EU, and instead creating a deeper co-operation with Norway and Denmark, in a movement reminiscent of Scandinavism. In the 2002 parliamentary elections it received 9337 votes, making it the tenth largest party outside of the Swedish parliament, and 1171 votes in the 2006 elections.

The party has not campaigned in any elections since 2006.

Policies 
 Sweden leaving the European Union
 More job creation
 Lower taxes on fuel so no one would have pay more than 7 SEK for a litre of fuel.
 Strong opposition to discrimination and racism
 Higher pensions for pensioners
 Higher salaries for workers
 Progressive taxation

References

External links
 Ny Framtid - Official site 

Political parties with year of establishment missing
Eurosceptic parties in Sweden
Defunct political parties in Sweden